This is a list of 124 species in Tachinus, a genus of crab-like rove beetles in the family Staphylinidae.

Tachinus species

 Tachinus addendus Horn, 1877 g b
 Tachinus alishanensis Hayashi, 1990 c g
 Tachinus andoi Tang et al., 2003 c g
 Tachinus angustatus Horn, 1877 g
 Tachinus apicalis Erichson, 1839 g
 Tachinus apterus Méklin, 1853 g
 Tachinus atripes J.Sahlberg, 1876 g
 Tachinus axillaris Erichson, 1839 g b
 Tachinus basalis Erichson, 1839 c g b
 Tachinus beckeri Ullrich, 1975 c g
 Tachinus becquarti Bernhauer, 1938 c g
 Tachinus bernhaueri Luze, 1901 c g
 Tachinus bicuspidatus Sahlberg, J., 1880 c g
 Tachinus binotatus Li et al., 2000 c g
 Tachinus bipustulatus Fabricius, 1793 c g
 Tachinus bonvouloiri Pandellé, 1869 g
 Tachinus brevicuspis Schülke, 2003 c g
 Tachinus brevipennis J.R.Sahlberg, 1880 g
 Tachinus brunneus Ullrich, 1975 g
 Tachinus caelatus Ullrich, 1975 c g
 Tachinus canadensis Horn, 1877 g
 Tachinus chinensis Bernhauer, 1933 c g
 Tachinus contortus Hatch, 1957 g
 Tachinus corticinus Gravenhorst, 1802 g b
 Tachinus crotchi  b
 Tachinus crotchii Horn, 1877 g
 Tachinus debilis Horn, 1877 g
 Tachinus dilatatus Hatch, 1957 g
 Tachinus discoideus Erichson, 1839 g
 Tachinus edentulus Ullrich, 1975 c g
 Tachinus edwardi Herman, 2001 g
 Tachinus elegans Eppelsheim, 1893 c g
 Tachinus elongatus Gyllenhal, 1810 c g
 Tachinus emeiensis Zhang et al., 2003 c g
 Tachinus fanjingensis Li et al., 2004 c g
 Tachinus fauveli Pandelle, 1869 g
 Tachinus fimbriatus Gravenhorst, 1802 g b
 Tachinus fimetarius Gravenhorst, 1802 g
 Tachinus flavolimbatus Pandellé, 1869 g
 Tachinus fortepunctatus Bernhauer, 1933 c g
 Tachinus frigidus Erichson, 1839 g b
 Tachinus fulvipes Erichson, 1840 g
 Tachinus fumipennis (Say, 1834) g b
 Tachinus gelidus Eppelsheim, 1893 c g
 Tachinus gigantulus Bernhauer, 1933 c g
 Tachinus grandicollis Bernhauer, 1917 c g
 Tachinus hedini Ullrich, 1975 c g
 Tachinus humeralis Gravenhorst, 1802 g
 Tachinus humeronotatus Zhao & Li, 2002 c g
 Tachinus instabilis Mäklin, 1853 c g
 Tachinus insularis Hayashi, 1987 c g
 Tachinus jacuticus  g
 Tachinus japonicus Sharp, 1888 c g
 Tachinus javanus Cameron, 1937 c g
 Tachinus kabakovi Veselova, 1993 c g
 Tachinus kaiseri Bernhauer, 1934 c g
 Tachinus kaszabi Ullrich, 1975 c g
 Tachinus laticollis Gravenhorst, 1802 c g
 Tachinus latissimus Tikhomirova, 1973 g
 Tachinus latiusculus Markel & Kiesenwetter, 1848 g
 Tachinus licenti Bernhauer, 1938 c g
 Tachinus lignorum (Linnaeus, 1758) g
 Tachinus lii Schülke, 2005 c g
 Tachinus limbatus Melsheimer, 1844 g b
 Tachinus lohsei Ullrich, 1975 c g
 Tachinus longelytratus Ullrich, 1975 c g
 Tachinus ludwigbenicki Ullrich, 1975 c g
 Tachinus luridus Erichson, 1840 g b
 Tachinus maculicollis Mäklin, 1852 g b
 Tachinus maculipennis Cameron, 1928 c g
 Tachinus maderi Bernhauer, 1939 c g
 Tachinus manueli Sharp, 1874 g
 Tachinus marginatus Fabricius, 1793 c g
 Tachinus marginellus (Fabricius, 1781) g
 Tachinus masahiroi Li & Zhao, 2003 c g
 Tachinus masaohayashii Hayashi, 1990 c g
 Tachinus memnonius Gravenhorst, 1802 g b
 Tachinus mercatii Jarrige, 1966 g
 Tachinus miltoni Schülke, 2003 c g
 Tachinus minimus Campbell, 1973 g
 Tachinus montanellus Bernhauer, 1933 c g
 Tachinus nigriceps Sharp, 1888 c g
 Tachinus nigricornis Mannerheim, 1843 g
 Tachinus nitouensis Ullrich, 1975 c g
 Tachinus ohbayashii Li et al., 2001 c g
 Tachinus pallipes Gravenhorst, 1806 c g
 Tachinus parasibiricus Zhang et al., 2003 c g
 Tachinus piceus Cameron, 1932 g
 Tachinus picipes Erichson, 1839 g b
 Tachinus potanini Veselova, 1981 c g
 Tachinus punctipennis Sahlberg, J., 1876 c g
 Tachinus punctus Gravenhorst, 1806 g
 Tachinus quebecensis Robert, 1946 g
 Tachinus rainieri Hatch, 1957 g
 Tachinus roborowskyi Reitter, 1887 c g
 Tachinus robustus Zhao et al., 2003 c g
 Tachinus rufipennis Gyllenhal, 1810 c g
 Tachinus rufipes Linnaeus, 1758 c g
 Tachinus sahlbergi Fauvel, 1900 c g
 Tachinus satoi Li & Zhao, 2003 c g
 Tachinus scapularis Stephens, 1832 g
 Tachinus schilowi Ullrich, 1975 c g
 Tachinus schneideri Luze, 1900 g
 Tachinus schwarzi Horn, 1877 g
 Tachinus semirufus Horn, 1877 g b
 Tachinus sibiricus Sharp, 1888 c g
 Tachinus signatus Gravenhorst, 1802 g
 Tachinus silphoides Schülke, 2005 c g
 Tachinus sinensis Li & Zhao, 2002 c g
 Tachinus smetanai Campbell, 1973 g
 Tachinus splendidus Gravenhorst, 1806 g
 Tachinus stacesmithi Campbell, 1973 g
 Tachinus striatipennis Schülke, 2005 c g
 Tachinus subterraneus (Linnaeus, 1758) g
 Tachinus sugayai Schülke, 2003 c g
 Tachinus taichungensis Campbell, 1993 c g
 Tachinus taiwanensis Shibata, 1979 g
 Tachinus thruppi Hatch, 1957 g
 Tachinus tianmuensis Li et al., 2000 c g
 Tachinus vergatus Campbell, 1973 g
 Tachinus watanabei Shibata, 1979 c g
 Tachinus yasuakii Li et al., 2002 c g
 Tachinus yasutoshii Ito, 1993 c g
 Tachinus yushanensis Campbell, 1993 c g

Data sources: i = ITIS, c = Catalogue of Life, g = GBIF, b = Bugguide.net

References

Tachinus